The 2022–23 Biathlon World Cup – Stage 4 was the fourth event of the season and was held in Pokljuka, Slovenia, from 5 to 8 January 2023.

Schedule of events 
The events took place at the following times.

Medal winners

Men

Women

Mixed

References 

Biathlon World Cup - Stage 4, 2022-23
2022–23 Biathlon World Cup
Biathlon competitions in Slovenia
Biathlon World Cup